Eddy Wauters (born 12 July 1933) is the former chairman of Royal Antwerp Football Club. He was formerly a player at the club and was capped four times by the Belgium national team.

External links
 
 Profile - Antwerp
 

1933 births
Living people
Belgian footballers
Belgium international footballers
Royal Antwerp F.C. players
Belgian football managers
Royal Antwerp F.C. managers
New York Hakoah players
Belgian expatriate footballers
Expatriate soccer players in the United States
Association football defenders
People from Borgerhout